The 2022 Northern Talent Cup is the third season of the Northern Talent Cup. The season will start on May 13 at the Circuit Bugatti, and will end on September 4 at the Red Bull Ring. The series race using KTM 250 Standard.

Calendar and results

Entry list

Riders' Championship standings 
Points were awarded to the top fifteen riders, provided the rider finished the race.

{|
|

References 

Northern Talent Cup
Northern Talent Cup